Kerry Football Club (Irish: Cumann Peile Chiarraí) is an Irish association football club based in Tralee, County Kerry. They play their home matches at Mounthawk Park.

The club will compete in the League of Ireland First Division, starting in the 2023 season, with an inaugural fixture against Cobh Ramblers.

History 
Participation from County Kerry in the League of Ireland began when a team representing the Kerry District League (KDL) participated in the Eircom U21 League in 2002 and 2003, while Tralee Dynamos subsequently played in the third-tier A Championship between 2009 and 2011. Following the folding of the A Championship in 2011, Tralee Dynamos submitted an application for a licence to compete in the League of Ireland First Division for the 2012 season. However, their application was unsuccessful.

The KDL resumed participation with the League of Ireland at underage level in the late 2010s, joining the Southern Elite Division of the Under-17 League in 2016 and subsequently that of the Under-19 League in 2019.

It was announced on 22 June 2022 that an application had been made by Kerry Football Club, an entity comprising the KDL and a consortium led by Brian Ainscough and Billy Dennehy, for a licence to compete in the League of Ireland for the 2023 season.

The application was deemed successful on 16 November, when Kerry were awarded a licence for the First Division. The club will operate on a fully amateur basis for the 2023 season, and play their games in Mounthawk Park. On 19 December 2022, Dennehy was announced as the club's first manager. Later that same day, Treaty United midfielder Matt Keane became Kerry FC's first contracted player, followed by Seán McGrath from Cobh Ramblers. The club's first ever competitive senior fixture took place on 17 February 2023, a 2–0 home defeat against Cobh Ramblers at Mounthawk Park. The following week, Leo Gaxha became the scorer of the club's first ever goal at senior level, in a 3–1 defeat against Bray Wanderers at the Carlisle Grounds. On March 3, Kerry secured their first point in the League of Ireland, following a 1-1 draw with Treaty United at Mounthawk Park.

First Team Squad

2023 Fixtures
SSE Airtricity League First Division

See also 
 Tralee Dynamos A.F.C.

References

External links
 

Association football clubs established in 2022
Amateur association football teams
Association football clubs in County Kerry
2022 establishments in Ireland
League of Ireland First Division clubs
Sport in Tralee